Glen Wild Methodist Church is a historic Methodist church on Old Glen Wild Road in Glen Wild, Sullivan County, New York.  It was built in 1867 and is a rectangular, wood-frame building with board and batten siding in a vernacular Gothic Revival style.  It features square based tower, with belfry and steeple, projecting from the front facade.  Also on the property is the former church hall built in 1944.  It is a small, one-story wood-frame L-shaped building.

It was added to the National Register of Historic Places in 1984.

References

Methodist churches in New York (state)
Churches on the National Register of Historic Places in New York (state)
Gothic Revival church buildings in New York (state)
Churches completed in 1867
19th-century Methodist church buildings in the United States
Churches in Sullivan County, New York
National Register of Historic Places in Sullivan County, New York